Ramciel is a location in South Sudan  that will serve as the site of the future national capital. John Garang, the first president of Southern Sudan, allegedly wanted to place the national capital in Ramciel during his administration, but he died before South Sudan achieved independence and its largest city of Juba became the capital instead.

Geography
There is currently no tarmacked road between Juba and Ramciel, but it is estimated that it will take under two hours to travel on a tarmacked road to Juba. Under ideal conditions, it would also probably take about 30 minutes to travel to Rumbek and up to three hours to Wau from Ramciel.
 
The largest grass swamp in the world, the Sudd, lies in the middle of Greater Bahr el Ghazal and Greater Upper Nile, thus making direct road communications between towns located at the opposite four corners of the Sudd practically impossible; thus the need to go around the swamp, which currently makes both Malakal and Bentiu inaccessible by road from the south and west in the wet season from June to November.

Inhabitants
The area is inhabited by the Awan community of Ciec Manyiel, under Yirol East County, Lakes State, South Sudan. The land is used for grazing and cultivation during the dry season and in the Nile marshes during the wet season. There are conflicting reports over its suitability for large-scale construction, with some characterising the area as sunken and swampy, and others contending that the rocky highlands can support a major city if one were to be built there. The area is located on the west bank of the River Nile in South Sudan.

National capital proposal
In early February 2011, what was then the Autonomous Government of Southern Sudan adopted a resolution to find a new capital for South Sudan. Ramciel was one of the two proposed locations for the site. Lakes Governor Chol Tong Mayay visited Ramciel later in the month to raise attention for its bid to be the site of the new capital. "The late Dr John Garang promised to build Ramciel as the capital of South Sudan and having it here will be a dream come true." Just prior to South Sudanese independence in July 2011, a government spokesman confirmed the federal government of the country was still considering building a new capital at Ramciel. On 2 September, the federal cabinet voted to designate Ramciel as the site for a planned city, to be demarcated from Lakes state. Information Minister Barnaba Marial Benjamin said the move would likely take three to five years to complete and would be conducted in stages.

Vice President Riek Machar said in mid-December 2011 that the government of South Sudan is planning to build a major international airport in a free trade zone to be established in Tali, just outside Ramciel. Machar suggested that this airport could handle traffic from large cargo planes for which other regional airports are not designed, an asset that would be vital to realizing Machar's vision for South Sudan to become a trade hub in the center of the African continent.

A contract was awarded in 2012 to conduct a survey and feasibility study of the site. The proposed area has been visited multiple times by then-vice president Riek Machar and in 2012 by high-ranking government officials.

See also
 List of purpose-built national capitals

References

Populated places in Lakes (state)
Planned capitals
Government of South Sudan